Shasta is a rural locality (a settlement) in Nimengskoye Rural Settlement of Onezhsky District, Arkhangelsk Oblast, Russia. The population was 329 as of 2010. There are 5 streets.

Geography 
Shasta is located 995 km southwest of Onega (the district's administrative centre) by road. Nimenga is the nearest rural locality.

References 

Rural localities in Onezhsky District